Stoycho Atanasov (born 14 May 1997) is a Bulgarian professional footballer who plays as a defender.

References

External links

Living people
1997 births
Bulgarian footballers
Bulgaria youth international footballers
Association football defenders
PFC Chernomorets Burgas players
PFC Litex Lovech players
PFC CSKA Sofia players
FC Arda Kardzhali players
FC Lokomotiv 1929 Sofia players
First Professional Football League (Bulgaria) players
Sportspeople from Burgas